The Amos Morse House was a historic house at 77 North Street in Foxborough, Massachusetts.  It was a two-story wood-frame house, five bays wide, with a hip roof and twin interior chimneys.  It was a center entry, Federal Colonial design. It was built circa 1803 by Amos Morse, Sr., for his children, Amos Jr. and Sarah.  One of its ells was used by the Morses as a shop for producing straw hats, a significant industry in early 19th-century Foxborough.

Demolition
The house was demolished on December 20, 2019. The Kraft Group had purchased the property in 2002 while planning for expansion of the New England Patriots' home stadium. The building fell into disrepair over the years until deemed unsafe by the Kraft Group which announced their intent to demolish the building in late 2018. The town and the Kraft Group sought other alternatives over the years and also during a 6-month moratorium of the demolition, but none was agreed on.

National Register of Historic Places designation
The house was submitted for the National Register of Historic Places in November 1985, by historic preservation consultant Mary Pyne, in conjunction with owners Thomas Deakins and Carol Nathan.

The property description, per the NRHP nomination form:

The house was accepted on the National Register of Historic Places in 1986.

See also
National Register of Historic Places listings in Norfolk County, Massachusetts

References

Houses in Norfolk County, Massachusetts
Buildings and structures in Foxborough, Massachusetts
Houses on the National Register of Historic Places in Norfolk County, Massachusetts
Houses completed in 1803
Federal architecture in Massachusetts